Kadhalithal Podhuma is a 1967 Indian Tamil-language romance film directed by K. V. Srinivas and produced by under Modern Theatres. The film script was written by M. K. Devarajan and A. L. Narayanan wrote part of comedy script. Music was by Vedha. It stars Jaishankar, Vanisri, R. S. Manohar and Vennira Aadai Nirmala, with Thengai Srinivasan, V. S. Raghavan Rukmani and B. V. Radha in supporting roles. The film was released on 1 November 1967.

Plot 

Ravi is separated from his father Somasundaram, when he is barely three years old. He is reared by a kind widow. Ravi grows into a fine young man. He falls in love with Geetha, who reciprocates his love. They engaged and are to be married soon. Mohana a friend of Ravi's is in love with him too. She tries to win him over, but Ravi does not harbour any feelings other than friendship for her. Realizing that her attempts are failed, Mohana is about to give up, but she sees a rays of hope, when she meets Thangaraj. Thangaraj is in love with Geetha and therefore he teams up with Mohana and hatches a plan to break the bond between Ravi and Geetha. The plot thickens when Mohana appears on the day of Ravi's wedding and announces that she is already married to him. Ravi denies that, but no one including his mother, believes him. Shattered by this development, Ravi moves in with his friend Mani meanwhile, Mohana makes herself comfortable at Ravi's home. Ravi's mother develops a soft corner for her and reveals to her a secret about Ravi's past. She also says to her that this will help Ravi unite with his parents. Thangaraj learns of this and tries to use this secret to his advantage. Ravi, on the other hand, is trying to prove to Geetha that Mohana's story is false. Do Thangaraj and Mohana succeed in their wicked plans and separate Ravi and Geetha? Does Geetha realise Mohana's true colours and unite with Ravi again?

Cast 
 Jaishankar as Ravi
 Vanisri as Mohana
 R. S. Manohar as Thangaraj
 Vennira Aadai Nirmala as Geetha
 Thengai Srinivasan as Mani
 V. S. Raghavan as Somasundaram
 Kumari Rukmani as Ravi's adoptive mother
 R. Pakkirisamy as Ravikumar
 Pushpamala as Manju
 B. V. Radha as Manju's sister

Production 
After several action and thriller films, Modern Theatres wanted a film in a different genre, so the romantic Kadhalithal Podhuma was made.

Soundtrack 
Music was by Vedha and lyrics were written by Kannadasan. The song "Konjam Nilladi" is based on "Quando quando quando" by Tony Renis. "Kadhal Penne Kanniyar" is based on "O Haseeno Zulfon Wali" from Teesri Manzil.

Release and reception 
Kadhalithal Podhuma was released on 1 November 1967, and succeeded commercially.

References

External links 
 

1960s romance films
1960s Tamil-language films
1967 films
Indian black-and-white films
Indian romance films